Ethiopia is a landlocked sovereign country located in the Horn of Africa.  Ethiopia is bordered by Eritrea to the north, Sudan to the west, South Sudan to the south-west, Kenya to the south, Somalia to the east and Djibouti to the north-east. Ethiopia is one of the oldest countries in the world and Africa's second-most populous nation. Ethiopia has yielded some of humanity's oldest traces, making the area important in the history of human evolution. Recent studies claim that the vicinity of present-day Addis Ababa was the point from which human beings migrated around the world. Ethiopian dynastic history traditionally began with the reign of Emperor Menelik I in 1000 BC. The roots of the Ethiopian state are similarly deep, dating with unbroken continuity to at least the Aksumite Empire (which adopted the name "Ethiopia" in the 4th century) and its predecessor state, D`mt (with early 1st millennium BC roots). After a period of decentralized power in the 18th and early 19th centuries known as the Zemene Mesafint ("Era of the Judges/Princes"), the country was reunited in 1855 by Kassa Hailu, who became Emperor Tewodros II, beginning Ethiopia's modern history. Ethiopia's borders underwent significant territorial expansion to its modern borders for the rest of the century, especially by Emperor Menelik II and Ras Gobena, culminating in its victory over the Italians at the Battle of Adwa in 1896 with the military leadership of Ras Makonnen, and ensuring its sovereignty and freedom from colonization. It was occupied by Benito Mussolini's Fascist Italy from 1936 to 1941, ending with its liberation by British Empire and Ethiopian Patriot forces. Its eastern border also changed in 1950 from the former 1908 Convention Line to the subsequent provisional administrative line.

General reference

 Pronunciation: 
 Common English country name: Ethiopia
 Official English country name: The Federal Democratic Republic of Ethiopia
 Common endonym(s):  
 Official endonym(s):  
 Adjectival(s): Ethiopian
 Demonym(s):
 Etymology: Name of Ethiopia
 International rankings of Ethiopia
 ISO country codes: ET, ETH, 231
 ISO region codes: See ISO 3166-2:ET
 Internet country code top-level domain: .et

Geography of Ethiopia 

Geography of Ethiopia
 Ethiopia is: a landlocked country
 Location:
 Eastern Hemisphere and Northern Hemisphere
 Africa
 North Africa
 East Africa
 Horn of Africa
 Time zone:  East Africa Time (UTC+03)
 Extreme points of Ethiopia
 High:  Ras Dejen 
 Low: Denakil Depression 
 Land boundaries:  5,328 km
 723 km
 883 km
 1,600 km
 912 km
 861 km
 349 km
 Coastline:  none
 Population of Ethiopia: 79,221,000 (July 2008)  - 15th most populous country
 
 Area of Ethiopia: 1,104,300 km2
 Atlas of Ethiopia

Environment of Ethiopia 

Environment of Ethiopia
 Climate of Ethiopia
 Environmental issues in Ethiopia
 Ecoregions in Ethiopia
 Renewable energy in Ethiopia
 Protected areas of Ethiopia
 National parks of Ethiopia
 Wildlife of Ethiopia
 Fauna of Ethiopia
 Birds of Ethiopia
 Mammals of Ethiopia

Natural geographic features of Ethiopia 
 Glaciers in Ethiopia: none 
 Islands of Ethiopia
 Lakes of Ethiopia
 Mountains of Ethiopia
 Volcanoes in Ethiopia
 Rivers of Ethiopia
 World Heritage Sites in Ethiopia

Regions of Ethiopia 

Regions of Ethiopia

Ecoregions of Ethiopia 

List of ecoregions in Ethiopia

Administrative divisions of Ethiopia 

Administrative divisions of Ethiopia

Regions of Ethiopia 

Regions of Ethiopia
 Afar
 Amhara
 Benishangul-Gumuz
 Gambela
 Harari
 Oromia
 Somali
 Southern Nations, Nationalities, and People's Region
 Tigray

Zones of Ethiopia 

Zones of Ethiopia

Municipalities of Ethiopia 
 Capital of Ethiopia: Addis Ababa
 Cities of Ethiopia

Demography of Ethiopia 

Demographics of Ethiopia

Government and politics of Ethiopia 
 
 Form of government: federal parliamentary republic
 Capital of Ethiopia: Addis Ababa
 Elections in Ethiopia
 Political parties in Ethiopia

Branches of the government of Ethiopia 

Government of Ethiopia

Executive branch of the government of Ethiopia 
 Head of state -  President of Ethiopia, Mulatu Teshome
 Head of government -  Prime Minister of Ethiopia, Hailemariam Desalegn
 Council of Ministers
 Prime Minister of Ethiopia -  Hailemariam Desalegn
 Deputy Prime Ministers of Ethiopia -  Debretsion Gebremichael, Demeke Mekonnen, Muktar Kedir
Ministry of Foreign Affairs -  Tewodros Adhanom
Ministry of Defense -  Siraj Fegesa
Ministry of Federal Affairs -  Shiferaw Teklemariam
Ministry of Justice -  Berhan Hailu
Ministry of Civil Service -  Muktar Kedir
Ministry of Finance and Economic Development -  Sufian Ahmed
Ministry of Agriculture -  Tefera Deribew
Ministry of Industry -  Mekonnen Manyazewal
Ministry of Trade and Industry -   Kebede Chane
Ministry of Science and Technology -  Desse Dalke
Ministry of Transport -  Diriba Kuma
Ministry of Communications and Information Technology -  Debretsion Gebremichael
Ministry of Urban Development and Construction -  Mekuria Haile
Ministry of Water and Energy -  Alemayehu Tegenu
Ministry of Mines -  Sinkinesh Ejigu
Ministry of Education -  Demeke Mekonnen
Ministry of Health -  Keseteberhan Admasu
Ministry of Labor and Social Affairs -  Abdulfetah Abdulahi Hassen
Ministry of Culture and Tourism -  Amin Abdulkadir
Ministry of Women, Youth and Children’s Affairs -  Zenebu Tadesse

Legislative branch of the government of Ethiopia 
 Federal Parliamentary Assembly (bicameral)
 Upper house: House of Federation
 Lower house: House of People's Representatives

Judicial branch of the government of Ethiopia 

Court system of Ethiopia

Foreign relations of Ethiopia 

Foreign relations of Ethiopia
 Diplomatic missions in Ethiopia
 Diplomatic missions of Ethiopia
 Foreign aid to Ethiopia

International organization membership 
The Federal Democratic Republic of Ethiopia is a member of:

 African, Caribbean, and Pacific Group of States (ACP)
 African Development Bank Group (AfDB)
 African Union (AU)
 African Union/United Nations Hybrid operation in Darfur (UNAMID)
 Common Market for Eastern and Southern Africa (COMESA)
 Food and Agriculture Organization (FAO)
 Group of 24 (G24)
 Group of 77 (G77)
 Inter-Governmental Authority on Development (IGAD)
 International Atomic Energy Agency (IAEA)
 International Bank for Reconstruction and Development (IBRD)
 International Civil Aviation Organization (ICAO)
 International Criminal Police Organization (Interpol)
 International Development Association (IDA)
 International Federation of Red Cross and Red Crescent Societies (IFRCS)
 International Finance Corporation (IFC)
 International Fund for Agricultural Development (IFAD)
 International Labour Organization (ILO)
 International Maritime Organization (IMO)
 International Monetary Fund (IMF)
 International Olympic Committee (IOC)
 International Organization for Migration (IOM) (observer)
 International Organization for Standardization (ISO)
 International Red Cross and Red Crescent Movement (ICRM)

 International Telecommunication Union (ITU)
 International Telecommunications Satellite Organization (ITSO)
 International Trade Union Confederation (ITUC)
 Inter-Parliamentary Union (IPU)
 Multilateral Investment Guarantee Agency (MIGA)
 Nonaligned Movement (NAM)
 Organisation for the Prohibition of Chemical Weapons (OPCW)
 Permanent Court of Arbitration (PCA)
 United Nations (UN)
 United Nations Conference on Trade and Development (UNCTAD)
 United Nations Educational, Scientific, and Cultural Organization (UNESCO)
 United Nations High Commissioner for Refugees (UNHCR)
 United Nations Industrial Development Organization (UNIDO)
 United Nations Mission in Liberia (UNMIL)
 United Nations Operation in Cote d'Ivoire (UNOCI)
 Universal Postal Union (UPU)
 World Customs Organization (WCO)
 World Federation of Trade Unions (WFTU)
 World Health Organization (WHO)
 World Intellectual Property Organization (WIPO)
 World Meteorological Organization (WMO)
 World Tourism Organization (UNWTO)
 World Trade Organization (WTO) (observer)

Law and order in Ethiopia 
 
Law of Ethiopia
 Constitution of Ethiopia
 Human rights in Ethiopia
 LGBT rights in Ethiopia
 Child marriage in Ethiopia
 Law enforcement in Ethiopia

Military of Ethiopia 
 
Military of Ethiopia
 Command
 Commander-in-chief:
 Ministry of Defence of Ethiopia
 Forces
 Army of Ethiopia
 Navy of Ethiopia
 Air Force of Ethiopia
 Military history of Ethiopia

Local government in Ethiopia 

Local government in Ethiopia

History of Ethiopia 

History of Ethiopia
Current events of Ethiopia
 Economic history of Ethiopia
 Military history of Ethiopia

Culture of Ethiopia 

Culture of Ethiopia
 Architecture of Ethiopia
 Cuisine of Ethiopia
 List of Ethiopian dishes
 Languages of Ethiopia
 Media in Ethiopia
 National symbols of Ethiopia
 Coat of arms of Ethiopia
 Flag of Ethiopia
 National anthem of Ethiopia
 People of Ethiopia
 Prostitution in Ethiopia
 Public holidays in Ethiopia
 Religion in Ethiopia
 Christianity in Ethiopia
 Hinduism in Ethiopia
 Islam in Ethiopia
 Judaism in Ethiopia
 World Heritage Sites in Ethiopia

Art in Ethiopia 
 Cinema of Ethiopia
 Music of Ethiopia

Sports in Ethiopia 

Sports in Ethiopia
 Football in Ethiopia
 Ethiopia at the Olympics

Economy and infrastructure of Ethiopia

Economy of Ethiopia
 Economic rank, by nominal GDP (2007): 98th (ninety-eighth)
 Agriculture in Ethiopia
 Coffee production in Ethiopia
 Fishing in Ethiopia
 Forestry in Ethiopia
 Banking in Ethiopia
 National Bank of Ethiopia
 Communications in Ethiopia
 Internet in Ethiopia
 Land reform in Ethiopia
 Companies of Ethiopia
 Currency of Ethiopia: Birr
 ISO 4217: ETB
 Energy in Ethiopia
 Health care in Ethiopia
 Mining in Ethiopia
 Ethiopia Stock Exchange
 Addis Ababa Stock Exchange
 Tourism in Ethiopia
 Trade unions in Ethiopia
 Transport in Ethiopia
 Airports in Ethiopia
 Rail transport in Ethiopia
 Water supply and sanitation in Ethiopia

Education in Ethiopia 

 Education in Ethiopia

Health in Ethiopia 

 Health in Ethiopia

See also 

Ethiopia
 
 
 
 
 Index of Ethiopia-related articles
 List of Ethiopia-related topics
 List of international rankings
 Member state of the United Nations
 Outline of Africa
 Outline of geography

References

External links

 Overview
 Rural poverty in Ethiopia (IFAD)

 Education
 Addis Ababa University
 Arba Minch University
 Bahir Dar University
 Debub University
 Gondar University
 Haramaya University
 Jimma University
 Mekelle University

 Health
 List of Hospitals in Ethiopia

 Tourism
 
 Ethiopian Airlines
 Ethiopian Hotels Guide
 Ethiopian Tourism Commission
 Ethiopian Tourism information

 Photos
 Ethiopian photogallery

 Government
 Official Ethiopian News online
 Ministry of Foreign Affairs of Ethiopia
 Walta Information Center
 Aiga Forum

 Independent Ethiopian Web sites
 Ethiopian Community Association of Chicago
 EthioTube - Broadcast Ethiopia
 Addis Fortune
 yebbo travel
 Jimma Times
 Capital Ethiopia
 nazret.com
 CyberEthiopia
 Ethioindex
 Ethiopian Discussion Forum
 Made in Ethiopia
 Ethio2k
 Ethiofact
 EthioStartPage
 Ethiotrans
 Ethiopian Millennium
 Ethiopian Cult Information Center(ECIC)
 addisalem.com
 ethiospaces.com

Ethiopia
 
Ethiopia